Joe is a 1924 Australian silent film comedy directed by Beaumont Smith based on the stories of Henry Lawson about the character Joe Wilson.

It is believed to be a lost film.

Plot
Mary Brand (Constance Graham), the young housekeeper at old Black's station, becomes the wife of Joe Wilson (Arthur Tauchert), the painter. The couple take up farming, but Joe leaves on a business visit to Sydney, and becomes entangled in the affairs of his sister-in-law Barbara (Marie Lorraine), who has been instrumental in the destruction of a dress belonging to her employers. Joe pays for the dress and takes Barbara back to the bush.

Barbara reconciles with Harry Black, old Black's son, who has lately ended an unhappy marriage. Barbara and Harry fall in love.
 
Action sequences include a bushfire and a ball in the city.

Cast
Arthur Tauchert as Joe Wilson
Marie Lorraine as Barbara
Constance Graham as Mary Brand
Gordon Collingridge
Fernande Butler
Hal Scott
Dunstan Webb

Production
The movie was the film debut of Marie Lorraine, one of the famous McDonagh sisters. It was shot in June 1924 on location in the Burragorang Valley near Sydney, with interiors at the Rushcutter's Bay studio of Australasian Films. The ball scene was shot at the Ambassador's Dance Palais over a one-day 14-hour shoot.

The film was known before production as When the World Was Wide and was shot in the under the title Plain Joe.

Reception
The film received better reviews than most of Smith's work and was reportedly a box office success.

See also
List of lost films

References

External links
Joe in the Internet Movie Database
Joe at National Film and Sound Archive
Full text of Joe Wilson and His Mates by Henry Lawson

1924 films
Films directed by Beaumont Smith
Lost Australian films
Australian silent feature films
Australian black-and-white films
Australian comedy films
1924 comedy films
1924 lost films
Lost comedy films
Silent comedy films